{{DISPLAYTITLE:C23H38O2}}
The molecular formula C23H38O2 (molar mass: 346.55 g/mol) may refer to:

 (C9)-CP 47,497
 O-1871
 Rosterolone, or 1α-methyl-17α-propyl-5α-androstan-17β-ol-3-one

Molecular formulas